Bartusch is a German language surname. It stems from a reduced form of the male given name Bartholomew – and may refer to:
Gertrud Bartusch (died 1917), German botanical illustrator
Günter Bartusch (1943–1971), Grand Prix motorcycle road racer from the former East Germany

References 

German-language surnames
Surnames from given names